The 2018 Camping World Bowl was a college football bowl game played on December 28, 2018, between the West Virginia Mountaineers and the Syracuse Orange. It was the 29th edition of the Camping World Bowl, and one of the 2018–19 bowl games concluding the 2018 FBS football season. The game was sponsored by the recreational vehicle company Camping World.

Teams
The game was played between West Virginia from the Big 12 Conference and Syracuse from the Atlantic Coast Conference (ACC). Syracuse and West Virginia had long standing rivalry both as Independents and as members of the Big East Conference. This was the 61st time the two programs had met; Syracuse held a 33–27 series lead in prior games.

West Virginia Mountaineers

West Virginia received and accepted a bid to the Camping World Bowl on December 2. The Mountaineers entered the bowl with an 8–3 record (6–3 in conference). Quarterback Will Grier, tackle Yodny Cajuste, and wide receiver Gary Jennings announced that they would sit out the game in order to prepare for the 2019 NFL Draft.

Syracuse Orange

Syracuse received and accepted a bid to the Camping World Bowl on December 2. The Orange entered the bowl with a 9–3 record (6–2 in conference). Syracuse also entered the game short-handed, as defensive end Alton Robinson, defensive tackle McKinley Williams, and defensive back Antwan Cordy all missed the game for personal reasons.

Game summary

Scoring summary

Statistics

References

External links
 Box score at ESPN

Camping World Bowl
Cheez-It Bowl
Camping World Bowl
Camping World Bowl
West Virginia Mountaineers football bowl games
Syracuse Orange football bowl games